New Moon is an album by the Algerian composer and singer-songwriter Abderrahmane Abdelli. It was released in 1995 by Real World Records. The album was produced in Brussels, with Abdelli recording his vocals before he was deported; the album was finished with local street musicians who played Algerian instruments.

Critical reception

The Toronto Star deemed the album "extraordinarily rich and hypnotizing North African music."

Track listing
 "Adarghal Introduction" – 1:46
 "Adarghal (The Blind in Spirit)" – 4:09
 "Achaah (Resentment)" – 7:07
 "Lawan (Time)" – 4:01
 "Walagh (I Observe)" – 5:12
 "Ayafrouk (The Pigeon)" – 5:22
 "Imanza (Ancestors)" – 4:29
 "JSK (The Sporting Youth of Kabyl)" – 4:32
 "Igganniw (There Are No More Stars in My Sky)" – 4:01
 "Amegh Asiningh (Bad News)" – 5:08

References

External links
 Abdelli's official site

Abderrahmane Abdelli albums
1995 albums
Real World Records albums